Shanghai University School of Computer Engineering and Science is considered a leading school in computer science and engineering fields in Shanghai, China, the school was one of earliest established in Shanghai. Professor Sanli Li, Dean of the school, is one of China's pioneers in computer science and engineering.

The school undertakes around 150 projects every year with support from the Natural Science Foundation of China, the Committee of Science and Technology of Shanghai Municipal Government, the Shanghai Municipal Education Committee, as well as from many other private firms or companies. The school has also received nine national and ministerial awards for scientific and engineering advancement.

Departments:
Department of Computer Application Technology
Department of Computer Software and Theory
Department of Computer Architecture and Organization

Research Institutes:
High Performance Computing and Application Laboratory
Fault Tolerant Technology and Application Laboratory
Intelligent Information Processing Laboratory
Multi-media and Network Laboratory
Center for Advanced Computing and Applications Laboratory

Shanghai University